Lontrell Donell Williams Jr. (born November 8, 1999), better known by his stage name Pooh Shiesty, is an American rapper. He is signed to Gucci Mane's 1017 Records and Atlantic Records. He rose to fame in 2020 from his collaborations with the rapper and other artists within the label. He is perhaps best known for his 2020 single, "Back in Blood" featuring Lil Durk. Pooh Shiesty released his debut commercial mixtape, Shiesty Season, on February 5, 2021, which peaked at number 3 on the US Billboard 200. His stage name was given by his late brother, and it comes from his childhood nickname "Mr. Pooh", and the name "Shiesty", referring to his lifestyle.

Early life and education 
Shiesty is from Memphis, Tennessee, and grew up in the Cane Creek Apartments on the south side. He lived in Pflugerville, Texas, for two years. When he returned to Memphis, he took summer school to help him graduate high school. He began focusing on music at age 18.

Career

2019–2020: Commercial debut 
Pooh Shiesty started off his career with his debut single, "Hell Night", featuring fellow rapper Big30, which was released on March 15, 2019, followed by the official music video on February 19, 2020. "Shiesty Summer" was then released five months later, on August 20, 2019, succeeded by the music video the following day. His collaborative single "Choppa Talk" with Big30 was released only three days later, on August 23, 2019, but the video was released a few months prior, on May 6, 2019. His final release of the year came with the single "Day One" along with the accompanying visuals on November 25, 2019.

On March 11, 2020, Shiesty released the single "At It Again", but the visuals were released nine days prior. Four days later, he released the single "Main Slime", on March 15, 2020. On May 29, 2020, the latter song received a remix with an accompanying music video, featuring rapper Moneybagg Yo and record producer Tay Keith, the latter of who produced the original song as well. Two days later, Shiesty released the single "ABCGE" alongside the music video on June 3, 2020.

After releasing a few singles of his own, Shiesty received attention from rapper Gucci Mane, who later signed him to his record label, 1017 Records Aka The New 1017, Gucci Mane also signed him to an Atlantic Records deal sometime in April 2020. The two eventually ended up collaborating on Mane's single, "Still Remember", and appeared in the music video, both released on June 19, 2020. The song became Shiesty's initial rise to fame and recognition. Only six days later, he released the single "Monday to Sunday", featuring rappers Lil Baby and Big30, alongside the visuals on June 25, 2020. All three singles received music videos and also ended up appearing on Mane's fourth compilation album, So Icy Summer, which was released on July 3, 2020. The first half of the album consisted of songs by Mane and the second half consisted of songs from the rest of the label, known as the "New 1017", the latter of which is a collective of new signees to the label, which included Shiesty himself, with other labelmates Foogiano, K Shiday,  Enchanting, Big Scarr and Roboy. Shiesty and Gucci reunited within the album on the latter's single "Who Is Him", with an accompanying music video the same day.

On September 9, 2020, Shiesty released the single "Twerksum" alongside the music video. The whole 1017 label (himself, Gucci Mane, Foogiano, Big Scarr, Roboy, K Shiday, and Enchanting) teamed up on Roboy's single "1017 Loaded", which was released alongside an accompanying music video exactly one month later, on October 9, 2020. Both singles appeared on Gucci's fifth compilation album, So Icy Gang, Vol. 1, which was released on October 16, 2020. The album is similar to the second half of So Icy Summer, but is instead scattered by different artists of the label on the songs. In November 2020, Pooh Shiesty linked with SpotemGottem.

2020–present: Shiesty Season 
On November 6, 2020, Shiesty released the single "Back in Blood", featuring Chicago rapper Lil Durk. It ended up becoming his most-streamed song, and was soon succeeded by the official music video, which was released on January 2, 2021. It has received around two hundred sixty six million views on YouTube as of August 2022. Later, he was featured on fellow labelmate Foogiano's single "First Day in LA", which was released along with accompanying visuals on November 20, 2020. It appeared on the latter's debut commercial mixtape, Gutta Baby, to which Shiesty makes another appearance on the song "Menace", which was released on Thanksgiving Day, November 26, 2020.

Shiesty released the single "Guard Up" alongside the official music video on January 15, 2021. It serves as the third single to his debut commercial mixtape and first project, Shiesty Season, which he announced on the same day. On January 29, 2021, he was also featured on Lil Durk's song, "Should've Ducked", from the deluxe edition of Durk's sixth studio album, The Voice, and marks the second time that the two have collaborated, following "Back in Blood". "Neighbors", featuring rapper Big30 was released as the third single on February 2, 2021. The mixtape was released on February 5, 2021. It features guest appearances from Lil Durk, Gucci Mane, Big30, 21 Savage, Veeze, Foogiano, Lil Hank, Choppa Wop, and Tay Keith. The mixtape also includes the previously-released singles "Twerksum" and "Back in Blood" as the respective first and second singles.

On May 21, 2021, the deluxe edition of Shiesty Season was released, titled Shiesty Season – Spring Deluxe. The deluxe edition includes features from Lil Baby and G Herbo. Also in 2021, he was featured on the XXL Freshman Class.

On April 29, 2022, a new deluxe edition of Shiesty Season was released, titled Shiesty Season: Certified. This deluxe edition includes features from Gucci Mane, Jack Harlow, Lil Durk, 42 Dugg, and Lil Uzi Vert, among others.

Artistic influences 
Pooh Shiesty is influenced by Chief Keef, Kodak Black, and Lil Wayne. He listened to Lil Wayne for the longest, and is influenced the most by him.

Legal issues 
On October 13, 2020, Williams was arrested in connection to a shooting in Bay Harbor Islands, Florida. He faced several charges, including armed robbery, aggravated assault and battery, and criminal theft. He was released from custody on the same day of his arrest.

On June 9, 2021, Williams was arrested again, this time in connection to a shooting at a strip club in Northwest Miami-Dade. Williams was held with no bond, and remained in jail, despite the victim of the shooting recanting. On June 29, he was indicted over the Bay Harbor Islands robbery, and on July 8 he was ordered by the federal judge to be held without bond, pending trial.

On January 4, 2022, Williams pleaded guilty to federal conspiracy charges; he was facing up to 8 years in prison.

On April 20, 2022, Williams was sentenced to 5 years and 3 months in prison.

Discography

Compilation albums

Mixtapes

Singles

As lead artist

As featured artist

Other charted and certified songs

Guest appearances

Awards and nominations

Notes

References

External links 
 

1999 births
21st-century American male musicians
21st-century American rappers
American hip hop singers
American male rappers
American male songwriters
Atlantic Records artists
Gangsta rappers
Living people
Musicians from Memphis, Tennessee
People from Pflugerville, Texas
Rappers from Memphis, Tennessee
Southern hip hop musicians
Trap musicians
21st-century American criminals
Prisoners and detainees of Tennessee
Songwriters from Tennessee
Criminals from Tennessee
African-American male rappers